The Mersin Arena, is a multi-purpose stadium in Mersin, Turkey. Completed in 2013, it was the new home ground for Mersin İdman Yurdu, replacing the old Tevfik Sırrı Gür Stadium. It hosted the opening and closing ceremonies for the 2013 Mediterranean Games. The all-seater stadium has the capacity to host 25,534 spectators during football games.

Facts

Capacity 
 Normal seats: 20,667
 VIP seats: 3,773
 Protocol: 180
 Suites: 914
TOTAL: 25,534

Construction 
 Total concrete used during stadium construction: 55,000 m2
 Suit area: 4,812 m2
 Stairways: 34
 Lifts: 17
 Car Parking: 1.295
 Bus Parking 46

References

External links
Stadium Database Profile

Football venues in Turkey
Sports venues in Mersin
Sports venues completed in 2013